Season Finale 1998 - 2003, also known as Season Finale, is a compilation album by Héctor & Tito released in 2005 by VI Music, Machete Music and Universal Music Latino. In 2006, The Gold Series edition was released as part of a series of albums having re-released edition under this series done by many artist. This album contains tracks from their previous albums and albums from producers or DJs of the Reggaeton genre. This was also the first album since their separation the year prior. Based on the name it was most likely a farewell album for the fans and to indicate that this was the end of the duo. Although in 2007, they did release another compilation album titled "The Ultimate Urban Collection".

Track listing

References 

Héctor & Tito albums
2005 compilation albums
Reggaeton compilation albums